Yorp or YORP may refer to one of the following:
54509 YORP, an Earth co-orbital asteroid
Yarkovsky–O'Keefe–Radzievskii–Paddack effect, a second-order variation on the Yarkovsky effect
Youth Organization Registration Program, an initiative of the National Youth Commission (Philippines)